Longyan University is one of the full-time public undergraduate universities of Fujian Province authorized by the Ministry of Education of the People's Republic of China, which is located in Longyan City.

Its library stores over 1,000,000 books and periodicals in Chinese and other languages, serving as the largest centre of information in west Fujian.

History
Founded in 1958, Longyan University was previously called Longyan Higher Normal College. It was merged with Fujian Resources Industrial School in 2001. The current name of Longyan University dates back to May 2004, authorised by the Chinese Ministry of Education. At present, it is the only full-time undergraduate university in the west of Fujian.

Faculties and schools 
There are 9 colleges and departments in the university covering 6 fields, namely, literature, science, engineering, agronomy, management and education. The university offers 27 four-year undergraduate programmes and 10 three-year college programmes to students of different educational backgrounds, including over 7500 full-time students and more than 5500 students of adult education.

College of Humanities and Education
College of Foreign Languages
College of Economics and Management
College of Mathematics and Computer Science
College of Physics and Mechanical and Electrical Engineering
College of Chemistry and Materials Science
College of Resource Engineering
College of Life Science
Department of Physical Education
Department of Art
Teaching and Research Department of Ideological and Political Theory Courses
School of Continuing Education

Cooperationa university
Ling Tung University (TaiWan)
Saint Peter's College (U.S)
Macau University of Science and Technology (Macau)

See also
List of universities in China

External links
Longyan university Official Website
About Longyan University (English)
Longyan university Photos

 
Universities and colleges in Fujian
Educational institutions established in 1958
1958 establishments in China